Chiraiyakote is a Town in Mau district in the Indian state of Uttar Pradesh. The old Chiraiyakote town is segmented into different 'Mohallas'. The most prominent one is Sarai Mohalla which is the first mohalla when you enter Chiraiyakote from the Main Road. The other mohallas are Yusufabad Paschim, Purab and Mahatwana. The original inhabitants who normally live in the older parts of the town, are very cultured and generally well educated. This town is associated with many nearby villages. The prominent villages are Manpur, Rasulpur, Fattepur, Ausatpur, Raipur (Paliya), Mathiya, Manajit, Brahim Chak, Sirsa, Walinagar, Sarounda, Aldemau, Karmi, Khurdkarmi, Raipur.This is a historical place and has history dating back to more than 500 years. The town has a mix of Hindu and Muslim population. It is 28 km from Azamgarh and 30 km from Mau. It is situated on the state highway between Azamgarh and Ghazipur. As per the history, here is a very old fort of Maharaja "Chirai". The nearest railway station is "Dullahapur".

Language
Hindi, English, Bhojpuri & Urdu`

In Chiraiyakot, people generally speak Bhojpuri, Hindi and Urdu.  In schools and colleges, students use Hindi for communication. They also try to speak English. However, it is not commonly used. The college students also study Sanskrit.

Geography
It has an average elevation of 66 metres (217 feet).

Demographics
In the 2001 India census, Chiraiyakote had a population of 38,652. Males constituted 51% of the population and females 49%. Chiraiyakote has an average literacy rate of 64%, higher than the national average of 59.5%: male literacy is 70%, and female literacy is 59%. In Chiraiyakote, 17% of the population is under 6 years of age.

Education
In 90s,The first English medium School was built in chiraiyakot is St. Belal School located at Chiraiyakot Zameen Ataullah kharihani Road. After that in 2000-10 ,lots of school emerged out due to increment in number of students who wish to learn in English school like 'The Manner School' and 'Maa Sharda Inter School' and so many. At this time PKS Public School is the only CBSE affiliated school in Chiraiyakote where classes are from nursery to 12th (all streams) .Rashtriya Inter College & Shree Krishna Vidyapith Inter College (popularly known as Yadav School) are the oldest college in Chiraiyakote which are affiliated to the UP Board.RDS Public School is also one of the emerging school in Chiraiyakote. In the education field Chiraiyakote is developing day by day.

Entertainment
Chandra Chitra Mandir popularly known as Chandra Talkies is only theatre in chiraiyakot. Mainly Bhojpuri and sometimes Bollywood movies are screened in the theatre. The theatre also has a popular shopping complex attached to it.

Mau district